The 2019 Shimizu S-Pulse season involves the team competing in the J1 League, they finished 8th in the 2018 J1 League. They will also compete in the J.League Cup, and the Emperor's Cup.

Squad 
As of 30 January 2019.

Competitions

J1 League

League table

Results

J. League Cup

Group stage

Emperor's Cup

References 

Shimizu S-Pulse
Shimizu S-Pulse seasons